Nalumino Mundia (27 November 1927 – 9 November 1988) was a Zambian politician. He served as the 4th Prime Minister of the country from 18 February 1981 to 24 April 1985. He went on to serve as Zambia's ambassador to the United States, Brazil, Peru and Venezuela. He was born in Kalabo. He collapsed at a diplomatic function and subsequently died of a heart attack, in the USA, on 9 November 1988, and was survived by his wife and six children.

References
 Biographical sketch of Mundia at The Zambian

Notes

1927 births
1988 deaths
People from Kalabo District
Prime Ministers of Zambia
Ambassadors of Zambia to the United States
Ambassadors of Zambia to Brazil
Ambassadors of Zambia to Peru
Ambassadors of Zambia to Venezuela
Members of the Legislative Council of Northern Rhodesia
Members of the National Assembly of Zambia
Local government ministers of Zambia